Craig William Perks (born 6 January 1967) is a professional golfer from New Zealand who won the 2002 Players Championship.

Early life and amateur career
Born and raised in Palmerston North, New Zealand, Perks played college golf in the United States at the University of Oklahoma in Norman and the University of Southwestern Louisiana in Lafayette, Louisiana.

Professional career
Perks turned professional in 1993 and played on the second tier Nike Tour for several seasons. He became a member of the PGA Tour after a tie for 35th in the 1999 Qualifying School earned him his tour card for the 2000 season.

At age 35 in 2002, Perks unexpectedly won The Players Championship, one of the most prestigious tournaments on the PGA Tour. In the final pairing, he played the final three holes in only nine shots, three under par, with only one putt. Perks chipped in for eagle, sank a  birdie putt on the Island Green, then chipped in for par to win by two strokes. He was even par 72 for the final round, but only had two pars in the last fourteen  Starting the year at 256 in the world rankings, Perks climbed from 203 to 64 with the win, and was named the New Zealand Sportsman of the Year for 2002. It granted a five-year exemption on tour, but was his only win in 202 starts.

After making only one cut on the PGA Tour during 2006 and 2007, he announced his retirement in November 2007, and became a commentator on the Golf Channel.

Professional wins (1)

PGA Tour wins (1)

Playoff record
PGA Tour of Australasia playoff record (0–1)

Nike Tour playoff record (0–1)

Results in major championships

CUT = missed the half-way cut
"T" = tied

The Players Championship

Wins (1)

Results timeline

CUT = missed the halfway cut
"T" indicates a tie for a place.

Results in World Golf Championships

"T" = Tied

Team appearances
World Cup (representing New Zealand): 2002, 2004

See also
1999 PGA Tour Qualifying School graduates
2000 PGA Tour Qualifying School graduates

References

External links

New Zealand male golfers
Oklahoma Sooners men's golfers
Louisiana Ragin' Cajuns men's golfers
PGA Tour golfers
Sportspeople from Palmerston North
1967 births
Living people